Eesti Kontsert is an Estonian institution, which main activity is to organize music concerts and music festivals in Estonia and abroad. Annually, over 1000 concerts/festivals are organized by Eesti Kontsert.

The institution was established in 1941. Until 1989 it used the named Estonian SSR State Philharmonic.

Concerts/Festivals
Notable concerts/festivals:
 Tallinn Piano Festival
 Saaremaa Opera Festival
 Tallinn International Organ Festival
 Pärnu Opera Days
 Music of Seven Cities
 MustonenFest.

References

External links
 

Estonian music
Organizations based in Estonia